The Security and Prosperity Partnership of North America (SPP) was a supra-national level dialogue with the stated purpose of providing greater cooperation on security and economic issues. The Partnership was founded in Waco, Texas, on March 23, 2005, by Prime Minister of Canada Paul Martin, President of Mexico Vicente Fox, and U.S. President George W. Bush. It was the second of such regional-level initiatives involving the United States following the 1997 Partnership for Prosperity and Security in the Caribbean (PPS).

Since August 2009, the SPP is no longer active. It has been largely superseded by the annual North American Leaders' Summit, an event that was established as part of the SPP.

Organization 
The SPP was neither a treaty nor a trade agreement.

The initial SPP Working Groups were the Manufactured Goods and Sectoral and Regional Competitiveness Working Group, E-Commerce & ICT Working Group, Energy Working Group, Transportation Working Group, Food & Agriculture Working Group, Environment Working Group, Financial Services Working Group, Business Facilitation Working Group, Movement of Goods Working Group, and Health Working Group. The Transportation Working Group was formed to analyze border trade and traffic flows. The U.S. Health and Human Services Office of the Assistant Secretary for Preparedness and Response (ASPR) led the SPP Health Working Group, in order to improve the ability of three countries to mutually assist each other during public health emergencies, to exchange information for policy planning, and to improve product safety.

Goals 
The stated goals of the SPP were cooperation and information sharing, improving productivity, reducing the costs of trade, enhancing the joint stewardship of the environment, facilitating agricultural trade while creating a safer and more reliable food supply, and protecting people from disease.

Announced funding 
On 26 February 2008, Canada's Minister of Finance Jim Flaherty, announced his government's 2008 budget, which included "$29 million over two years to meet priorities under the Security and Prosperity Partnership of North America".

North American Competitiveness Council 
The North American Competitiveness Council (NACC) was an additional SPP working group. It was created later, at the second summit of the SPP in Cancún, Quintana Roo, Mexico, in March 2006. Composed of 30 corporate representatives from some of North America's largest companies, the North American Competitiveness Council was mandated to set priorities for the SPP and to act as a stable driver of policy implementation between the three countries.

Trilateral summit meetings 

As part of SPP, an annual trilateral summit was held between the leaders of the three countries. Following the cancellation of the SPP in 2009, meetings continued as the North American Leaders' Summit.

 March 23, 2005 - Baylor University, Waco, Texas, United States
A video of the Waco SPP Trilateral Summit News Conference is available online.

 March 31, 2006 - Cancún, Quintana Roo, Mexico
 Meeting between Mexican President Fox, Canadian Prime Minister Harper, and U.S. President Bush. A U.S. White House press release regarding the Cancun SPP Trilateral Summit is available online.

 August 20–21, 2007 - Montebello, Quebec, Canada
The United States, Canada, and Mexico had a major trilateral summit meeting regarding SPP at the Château Montebello in Montebello, Quebec. This conference was described as a public relations event with the purpose of promoting the SPP among investors and to reassure the public about the initiative. The summit was also noteworthy because a short five minute video uploaded to YouTube led to the eventual police admission of the use of undercover officers disguised as protesters at the summit. Critics charged that the undercover officers were agents provocateurs sent to disrupt the protest by inciting violence: "This circumstance is unique because it was among the very first occurrences in Canada where user-generated footage uploaded to video-sharing site YouTube elicited an official police response offered in defence of police tactics".

 April 21–22, 2008 - New Orleans, Louisiana, United States
In his 2008 State of the Union address, President George W. Bush announced that a summit on the SPP would be held from April 21–22, 2008, in New Orleans, Louisiana. According to the White House, the summit focused on improving the SPP initiatives and on discussing "hemispheric and global issues of importance to North America".

 August 9–10, 2009 - Guadalajara, Jalisco, Mexico

Criticism
In 2006, CNN anchor Lou Dobbs argued that the SPP was part of a plan to merge the United States, Canada, and Mexico into a North American Union similar to the European Union. At the time, Dobbs claimed that U.S. President Bush, who left office on January 20, 2009, was to have bypassed Congress and ultimately create a union based on a Texas highway corridor.

The Council of Canadians claimed that the SPP extended the controversial "no fly list" of the United States, made Canadian water a communal resource, and forced Canada and Mexico to adopt the United States' security policies—one of which would allow foreign military forces to neglect sovereignty in the case of a "civil emergency". It also touched on the issue of Albertan tar sands expansion to five times its current size.

On May 10, 2007, Conservative MP Leon Benoit, chair of the Canadian House of Commons Standing Committee on International Trade, prevented University of Alberta professor Gordon Laxer from testifying that SPP would leave Canadians "to freeze in the dark" because "Canada itself—unlike most industrialized nations—has no national plan or reserves to protect its own supplies" by saying Laxer's testimony was irrelevant, defying a majority vote to overrule his motion, shutting down the committee meeting, and leaving with the other three out of four Conservative members; the meeting later continued, presided over by the Liberal vice-chair. After these disruptions, the National Post reported on a Conservative party manual to, among other things, usurp Parliamentary committees and cause chaos in unfavourable committees. The New Democratic Party (NDP) also criticized SPP for being undemocratic, not open to Parliament, and opaque. NDP leader Jack Layton described the process as not simply unconstitutional, but "non-constitutional", held completely outside the usual mechanisms of oversight.

Approximately thirty U.S.-based organizations also sent an open letter to Congress on April 21, 2008, criticizing the secrecy and lack of any sort of democratic oversight:
"What differentiates the SPP from other security and trade agreements is that it is not subject to Congressional oversight or approval. The SPP establishes a corporate/government bureaucracy for implementation that excludes civil society participation. ... Facing a worrisome pact pushed forward in secrecy, it is time for Congress to halt this undemocratic approach and establish a process based on openness, accountability, and the participation of civil society.

Cancellation
In August 2009, the SPP website was updated to say: "The Security and Prosperity Partnership of North America (SPP) is no longer an active initiative. There will not be any updates to this site". Subsequent to this the website link does not connect and the cache website links do not work.

The NDP called this a "victory" which is "the result of the active and sustained efforts across the country, and across North America, of Canadian, Mexican, and American activists from the labour movement, civil society, progressive legislators and all those concerned and committed to build a better quality of life in our Canada and throughout North America".

Renewed discussions
On February 4, 2011, Canadian Prime Minister Stephen Harper and U.S. President Barack Obama announced a new security and prosperity initiative with plans to "pursue a perimeter approach to security in ways that support economic competitiveness, job creation, and prosperity".

On March 13, 2011, the Canadian government announced it was beginning a five-week consultation process "with all levels of government and with communities, non-governmental organizations and the private sector, as well as with our citizens on the implementation of the shared vision for perimeter security and economic competitiveness".

See also 
Canada–United States relations
Canada–U.S. Civil Assistance Plan, signed February 14, 2008
North American Free Trade Agreement
North American Plant Protection Organization
Independent Task Force on North America
North American Union
North American currency union (the currency of which is often called the "Amero")
North American Competitiveness Council
North American Aerospace Defense Command
Partnership for Prosperity and Security in the Caribbean
Alliance for Progress
Defence Diplomacy
Robert Pastor

Related infrastructure projects:
North American SuperCorridor Coalition – Connecting Mexico City, central United States, and several Canadian provinces
Trans-Texas Corridor – Superhighway connecting Northern Mexico and Texas
East–West Economic Corridor – Superhighway connecting Southeast Asian countries
Pan-European Corridor X – Superhighway connecting the European Union
European route E73 – fifth segment of Pan-European Corridor with toll road listings

References

External links
Security and Prosperity Partnership Of North America – Information by the United States government (no website any longer online at spp.gov)
Security and Prosperity Partnership of North America – Information by the Canadian government
 Alianza para la Seguridad y la Prosperidad en América del Norte – Information by the Mexican government
US Government Agency SPP Documents obtained by Judicial Watch via FOIA
From NAFTA to the SPP from Dollars & Sense magazine
Building a North American Community – report detailing how to improve upon the SPP
Governing the North American Free Trade Area: International Rule Making and Delegation in NAFTA, the SPP, and Beyond – Detailed analysis of SPP institutions

2005 in Canada
2007 in Canada
2005 in Mexico
Organizations established in 2005
Economy of Canada
Economic geography
Economy of Mexico
Economy of the United States
International organizations based in the Americas
Trilateral relations of Canada, Mexico, and the United States
2005 in international relations